Render to Caesar is a 2014 Nigerian crime thriller film written and produced by Desmond Ovbiagele, directed by Desmond Ovbiagele and Onyekachi Ejim. It stars Wale Ojo, Gbenga Akinnagbe, Omoni Oboli and Bimbo Manuel with Special appearances from Kehinde Bankole and Femi Jacobs. The film was initially slated to be released in the second quarter of 2013 but was pushed back due to delayed post production; it was however released on 28 March 2014. The film which was supported by Microsoft, Trace and FCMB tells the story of two friends who return from abroad to join the Nigeria Police Force, only to be faced with an impossible mystery case involving a criminal, Caesar (Lucky Ejim) who has been terrorising the city of Lagos for quite sometime.

Although the film received mixed critical reviews, it won awards for "Best Original Screenplay" and "Best Actor in a Supporting Role" at the 2014 Nollywood Movies Awards . It also received awards for "Best Screenplay" and "Best Sound Design" at the 2014 Best of Nollywood Awards.

Cast
Wale Ojo as Pade
Gbenga Akinnagbe
Omoni Oboli as Alero
Bimbo Manuel
Femi Jacobs
Onyekachi Ejim
Dede Mabiaku
Kalu Ikeagwu
Chris Iheuwa
Kehinde Bankole
KC Ejelonu
Steve Onu
MC Abbey
Yvonne Ekwere

Release
Render to Caesar premiered at the Silverbird Galleria, Victoria Island, Lagos on 28 March 2014. In 2015, it was shortlisted for the main feature film competition at the 24th edition of FESPACO in Ouagadougou, Burkina Faso. It was also an Official Selection at the 2015 San Diego Black Film Festival, as well as the 2014 Pan African Film Festival (PAFF).

Reception

Critical reception
Render to Caesar has been met with mixed reviews. Sodas & Popcorn gave it a rating of 3 out of 5 stars, it cited that the film has plot holes, says the technicalities are flawed mostly as a result of "lazy job". It concluded by stating: "For a genre which hasn’t really been explored in the Nigerian movie scene much, it tries to be unique by bringing in witty dialogues and a good degree of continuity, until pieces of the big puzzle (which are supposed to add up) fail to do so. Render to Caesar is an experiment, which even with its many flaws, in the end is a big step forward". Wilfred Okiche of YNaija says: "Render to Caesar wants to be many things at once. A crime thriller, a police procedural, a love story and a twisty film noir". He pointed out that although the film has its good moments, the moments are often ruined with bizarre turn of events, easy predictability or ridiculous plotholes. He added: "The special effects are not as spectacular as they could have been, the acting isn’t as fine as it should and the screenplay, with its twists and turns isn’t as impressive as it fancies itself". He concluded by saying the film seem more like an "experiment" than a "confident production".

Wilfred Okiche commended the film for its brilliant portrayal of the Nigerian Police force. He cited Ejim as the outstanding act in the film, but also stated that there is no chemistry between Omoni and Gbenga on screen and that their romantic scenes turn out to be one of the down sides of the screenplay.

Accolades
Render to Caesar received 9 nominations and won 2 awards at the 2014 Nollywood Movies Awards. It also received 3 nominations and won 2 awards at the 2014 Best of Nollywood Awards.

See also
 List of Nigerian films of 2014

References

External links

2014 films
2014 Nigerian films
English-language Nigerian films
2014 crime drama films
2014 crime thriller films
Films set in Lagos
Films shot in Lagos
Nigerian crime drama films
Nigerian crime thriller films
2010s English-language films